The Chiayi-Tainan Luka (嘉南勇士; literally "Chianan Braves") or abbreviated Chianan Luka was a professional baseball team in the Taiwan Major League (TML) that existed from 1997 to 2002. The team's home field included Chiayi County Baseball Stadium (not to be confused with Chiayi Baseball Field used by its CPBL then counterpart Chinatrust Whales) and Tainan Baseball Field. Except for winning championship in TML's first season in 1997, this team did not perform well throughout its history and it only ever attracted corporate sponsors in 2000 and 2001. As a result, this team used its home cities' names as its name for most of its existence rather than a company's name. After TML merged with the Chinese Professional Baseball League (CPBL) in 2003, this team merged with Taichung Agan and exchanged its name with Taipei Gida (later became Macoto Gida), which was further changed to Macoto Cobras since 2004.

Regular season records

TML Championships: once, 1997

Notable former players

Silvestre Campusano, Dominican former MLB player and coach in Mexican and Dominican leagues
Gavin Fingleson, South African-born Australian, Olympic silver medalist, baseball player with teams in Australia and United States
Paul Gonzalez, US born Australian – 2004 Athens Olympics Silver Medal, retired professional player in Australia, Japan and United States
Carlos Mirabal, US born retired professional player in Japan, Taiwan and United States
Hisanobu Watanabe, Japanese former professional player and coach

Home field

For the duration of their existence Chiayi-Tainan Luka called Chiayi County Baseball Stadium home. The baseball park opened in 1999 and is owned by Chiayi County Government. Located in Taibao City, it is often mistaken for Chiayi City Municipal Baseball Stadium, which displaced the County stadium following renovations in 1998.

See also
Chinese Professional Baseball League
Macoto Cobras

References 

Defunct baseball teams in Taiwan